Bainville-sur-Madon (literally Bainville on Madon) is a commune in the Meurthe-et-Moselle department in northeastern France.

Geography
The Madon forms most of the commune's eastern border.

Population

See also
 Communes of the Meurthe-et-Moselle department

References

Communes of Meurthe-et-Moselle